Füzér is a village in Borsod-Abaúj-Zemplén county, Hungary. It is the northernmost settlement in Hungary. The castle of Füzér is located in this village.

Picture gallery

External links 
 Street map 
 Aerial photographs of the Castle
 Images, history and google map of the Castle

Populated places in Borsod-Abaúj-Zemplén County
Castles in Hungary